The Portal (located at ) is the gap between the Lashly Mountains and Portal Mountain, through which the main stream of the Skelton Glacier enters the Skelton Névé from the polar plateau. The descriptive name  was given in January 1958 by a New Zealand party of the Commonwealth Trans-Antarctic Expedition (CTAE), 1956–58.

References 

1. USGS Geographic Names Information System (GNIS) (http://geonames.usgs.gov)

Mountain passes of the Ross Dependency
Hillary Coast